Changes is the fourteenth studio album by Etta James, released in 1980. It was recorded at the Sea-Saint studios in New Orleans, with Allen Toussaint arranging and producing, as well as contributing several songs.

Track listing

References

1980 albums
Etta James albums
Albums produced by Allen Toussaint
MCA Records albums